Zhang Junzhe (born 20 February 1991) is a Chinese footballer currently playing as a defender for Hebei China Fortune.

Club career
Zhang Junzhe began his football career with top-tier side Beijing Guoan and was promoted to their senior team in the 2010 league season. He would struggle to gain any competitive playing time and was loaned out to third tier football club Shenyang Dongjin F.C. in the 2013 league season. Upon his return to Beijing Guoan, Zhang still couldn't break into the senior team and was released from the club. He would join fourth tier club Changchun Shenhua and play in the Chinese Football Association Amateur League in the 2015 league season. In the 2016 league season second-tier club Beijing Enterprises Group took on Zhang as a free agent. On 21 February 2019 he joined top-tier club Hebei China Fortune.

Career statistics

References

External links
 

1991 births
Living people
Chinese footballers
Association football defenders
China League One players
Chinese Super League players
Beijing Guoan F.C. players
Shenyang Dongjin players
Beijing Sport University F.C. players
Hebei F.C. players